Woria is a nearly extinct Papuan language of the Indonesian province of Papua, on the eastern shore of Cenderawasih Bay. It is spoken in Botawa village, Waropen Regency, where the Lakes Plain language Saponi was also spoken.

Woria is lexically similar to the East Geelvink Bay languages and presumably belongs in that family, but is too poorly attested to be sure.

External links 
Paradisec's open access collection from Bert Voorhoeve includes Woira language materials

References

Critically endangered languages
East Geelvink Bay languages
Languages of western New Guinea